The jumping event at the 1900 Summer Olympics equestrian competition was similar to the modern event. 45 competitors entered, though only 37 competed, with some information known of around half of these. The event was won by Aimé Haegeman of Belgium, with his countryman Georges Van Der Poele taking second and Louis de Champsavin of France in third.

Background

This was the first appearance of the event, which has been held at every Summer Olympics at which equestrian sports have been featured (that is, excluding 1896, 1904, and 1908). It is the only event on the current programme that was held in 1900.

Competition format

Both military and non-military riders (and their mounts) were allowed to compete, excluding military school horses. The scoring format is not known. A single round was held. Riders could apparently compete multiple times on difference horses.

Schedule

Results

Nothing is known of scores for faults; the winners were listed by reference to their times only.

Notes

References

Sources
 International Olympic Committee medal winners database
 De Wael, Herman. Herman's Full Olympians: "Equestrian 1900". Accessed 29 July 2006. 
 

Jumping